Glenelg is a baseball club in the South Australian Baseball League who are commonly known as the Tigers. Their home ground is Anderson Reserve in Glenelg. The ground will host half the home games of the South Australia baseball team in the 2009 Claxton Shield.

References

External links
Glenelg Baseball Club

Australian baseball clubs
Sporting clubs in Adelaide